Topaz is a mineral or gemstone.

Topaz may also refer to:

Arts

Fictional characters and places
Topaz (Marvel Comics), a comic book sorceress
Agent Topaz, a character from the anime Sonic X
Topaz Trollhopper, a character from the animated series Trollz
Topaz Mortmain, a character from Dodie Smith's novel I Capture the Castle and its subsequent film adaptation
Topaz, a character in Steven Universe

Film and television
Topaz (1945 film), an amateur film documenting the World War II Japanese-American internment camp Topaz
Topaz (1969 film), a film directed by Alfred Hitchcock, based on the novel by Leon Uris
Topaz (1991 film), a Japanese film
Topacio, (Spanish for Topaz), a 1984 Venezuelan telenovela

Literature
"Sir Thopas", one of The Canterbury Tales
Topaz (novel), a 1967 novel by Leon Uris

Music
Topaz (The Rippingtons album), 1999
Topaz (Erik Friedlander album), 1999
Topaz (Israel Nash album), 2021
Topaz, a band consisting of Billy Cross, Rob Stoner and Jasper Hutchison
"Topaz", an instrumental song by Journey from their self-titled debut album Journey
"Topaz", a song by the B-52s from their album Cosmic Thing
"Topaz", a 2015 single by Jupiter

Biology
Topaz (apple), a variety of apple
Topaz (hummingbird), two species of hummingbirds in the genus Topaza
Ruby topaz (Chrysolampis mosquitus), a species of hummingbird
Topaz, a protein crystallography-related product of the company Fluidigm

Organizations
Topaz (bookmaker), in Azerbaijan
Topaz Energy, a defunct  petroleum retail chain in Ireland purchased by Circle K
TOPAZ (think tank), in the Czech Republic

Computer related
Topaz, the Ruby (programming language) implementation
Topaz, the proprietary file format developed for the Amazon Kindle e-reader
Topaz, the codename for HTC Touch Diamond2, a smartphone by HTC
Project ToPaZ, an early codename for the GNOME 3 environment

People
Dudu Topaz (1946–2009), Israeli TV personality and actor
Topaz, a cryptonym for Rainer Rupp (b. 1945), spy for East Germany who worked at NATO headquarters in Brussels
 William Topaz McGonagall (1825-1902), a Scottish poet.
Topaz Winters (b. 1999) Pen name of poet Priyanka Aiyer

Places

Australia 
 Topaz, Queensland, a locality in the Tablelands Region, Queensland, Australia

United States 
Topaz, California
Topaz, Missouri
Topaz Hotel, Washington, D.C.
Topaz War Relocation Center, west of Delta, Utah

Vehicles
Ekolot KR-030 Topaz, a Polish ultralight aircraft
Mercury Topaz, a car made by Ford Motor Company from 1984 to 1994
Topper Topaz, a sailing dinghy which can be rigged with 1, 2 or 3 sails
The Future Imagery Architecture radar imaging satellites

Vessels
Topaz (ship), the sailing ship captained by Mayhew Folger that rediscovered Pitcairn Island
Topaz (yacht), luxury motor yacht constructed by Lürssen in 2012

Other uses
TOPAZ nuclear reactor, a series of lightweight nuclear reactors flown in space by the Soviet Union and the Russian Federation
An apprentice in a lascar ship's crew
Topasses, a group of people of Portuguese descent in East Timor.

See also
Topaze (disambiguation)